Przyłęki  is a village in the administrative district of Gmina Białe Błota, within Bydgoszcz County, Kuyavian-Pomeranian Voivodeship, in north-central Poland.

The village has a population of 600.

Notable residents
 Arthur Godenau (1903–1983), Kriegsmarine officer

References

Villages in Bydgoszcz County